Turbonilla morenoi is a species of sea snail, a marine gastropod mollusk in the family Pyramidellidae, the pyrams and their allies.

Description
The length of the shell varies between 1.8 mm and 4.6 mm.

Distribution
This species occurs in the Pacific Ocean off Fiji, Vanuatu and New Caledonia

References

External links
 To Encyclopedia of Life
 To World Register of Marine Species

morenoi
Gastropods described in 2010